La Nubia Airport  is an airport serving Manizales, Colombia,  southeast of the city's downtown.

Due to its short runway and limited ramp space, the only aircraft that can use the airport are turbopropeller aircraft such as the Fokker 50, ATR 72, and Dash 8. The main problem of La Nubia airport is weather. Sometimes shut down due to fog, rain, or winds, it is difficult for airlines to offer a reliable schedule for the passengers wishing to visit Manizales and Caldas. Combined with its daylight-only hours of operation  and limited runway length, La Nubia has been seen as an obstacle to the region's development.

Airlines and destinations

See also
Coffee Airport
List of airports in Colombia

References

External links
OurAirports - La Nubia
SkyVector - La Nubia
 International Airport – Coffee Area (Project "Aeropuerto Internacional del Café")

Airports in Colombia
Buildings and structures in Caldas Department
Buildings and structures in Manizales